Parsa Jafari (born July 9, 1999) is an Iranian footballer who plays for Zob Ahan in the Persian Gulf Pro League.

References

External links
 

1999 births
Living people
Iranian footballers
Sportspeople from Mashhad
Association football goalkeepers
Esteghlal F.C. players
Saipa F.C. players
Zob Ahan Esfahan F.C. players